Hefei Prison is a prison in Hefei, Anhui, China established in 1954.

See also
List of prisons in Anhui

References
Laogai Research Foundation Handbook

Prisons in Anhui
1954 establishments in China
Buildings and structures in Hefei